Kok is either a Dutch occupational surname, "kok" meaning "cook", or an alternate spelling for the common Chinese surname Guo. Kok is a quite common surname in the Netherlands, ranking 27th in 2007 (20,834 people). Notable people with the surname Kok include:

List of people with the surname Kok
Ada Kok (born 1947), Dutch swimmer
Adam Kok III (1811–1875), leader of the Griqua people in South Africa
Alexander Kok (1926–2015), English cellist
Ann Kok (born 1973), Chinese Singaporean television actress and singer
 (1882–1969), Dutch poet, co-founder of De Stijl
Bessel Kok (born 1941), Dutch businessman
Boris Kok (born 1991), French-born Cambodian footballer
Christiaan Kok (born 1971), Zimbabwean cricketer
Debbie Kok (1963–2010), New Zealand football player
Derek Kok (born 1964), Hong Kong actor
Eelyn Kok (born 1978), Singaporean television actress
Felix Kok (1924–2010), English violinist, brother of Alexander Kok
George Kok (1922–2013), American basketball player
Gert-Jan Kok (born 1986), Dutch motorcycle racer
Gretta Kok (born 1944), Dutch swimmer
Huug Kok (1918–2011), Dutch singer
James Kok (1902–1976), Romanian bandleader, musician, and arranger
Jan Kok (1889–1958), Dutch footballer
Jan Kok (1899–1982), Dutch pharmacist and rector magnificus
Jito Kok (born 1994), Dutch basketball player
Jocie Kok (born 1982), Chinese-Singaporean singer
Kees Kok (born 1949), Dutch politician
 (1923–1945), Dutch draughtsman and designer
Marinus Kok (1916–1999), Dutch archbishop of the Old Catholic Church
Marja Kok (born 1944), Dutch actress and film director
Mary Kok (born 1940), Dutch swimmer
Melanie Kok (born 1983), Canadian rower
Mimi Kok (1934–2014), Dutch film and television actress
Paul Kok (born 1994), Dutch footballer
Peter Nyot Kok (died 2015), South Sudanese lawyer and minister of education
Pieter Kok (born 1972), Dutch physicist
Ralph Kok (born 1987), Dutch tennis player
Robert Kok (born 1957), Dutch footballer
Salomon Kok, Flemish Jewish diamond dealer and activist
Teresa Kok (born 1964), Malaysian politician
Vincent Kok (born 1965), Hong Kong actor, scriptwriter and film director
Werner Kok (born 1993), South African rugby player
Wim Kok (1938–2018), Dutch politician, prime minister of the Netherlands 1994–2002
Wjm Kok (born 1959), Dutch artist

See also
de Kok, surname
Kwok
Koch (surname)

References

Dutch-language surnames
Occupational surnames